Blaine Sumner (born June 22, 1987) is an American world champion powerlifter from Conifer, Colorado, currently residing in Gillette, Wyoming, United States.

Powerlifting
Blaine was the 2019 and 2016 IPF Open World Superheavyweight Champion and was the first American male to win a gold medal in the IPF Classic World Championships (2012). He was the 2012, 2015, 2016, 2018, and 2019 USAPL Superheavyweight Equipped Champion and Champion of Champions across all weight classes in 4 of those 5 years.

Blaine has set 28 World Records in the Classic Squat, Classic Total, and Equipped Squat, Equipped Bench Press, and Equipped Total. He has won thirteen National Championships and set 42 American Records in the Raw (Classic) Squat, Raw Total, Equipped Squat, Equipped Bench Press, Equipped Total, Junior Raw Squat, Junior Raw Deadlift, Junior Raw Total, and Junior Equipped Squat.

He has the highest single ply total of all time across all federations (including untested federations) of 1,296 kg (2,857 lbs). Including all triple ply lifters in all federations this ranks Blaine, with a single ply tested total, as the #4 of all time. Blaine's single ply squat of 515 kg (1,135 lbs) is the heaviest walked out squat of all time.

In what may be the most athletic display ever by a powerlifter, at the 2014 Arnold Sports Festival Blaine competed in 3 competitions over 3 consecutive days winning 2 gold medals, setting one world record, setting 2 American records, and winning best overall lifter.

On March 5, 2016 Blaine Sumner made history at the Arnold Sports Festival when he broke 6 IPF World Records. He became the first lifter in IPF history to squat 500 kg (1,102 lbs) breaking the existing record by 22 lbs. He then broke 3 bench press records finishing with 401.5 kg (885 lbs) which broke the existing record by 67 lbs. Blaine finished by breaking the record total twice. His final total was 2,803 lbs shattering the existing record by 91 lbs. This calculates to the highest Wilks score in IPF history of 692.2.

Blaine became the first lifter across all powerlifting federations to bench press over 1,000 lbs in single ply gear on March 2, 2019. This broke his own record by 88 lbs. Blaine was the first person to achieve these IPF/USAPL milestones:
 400 kg raw squat
 400 kg equipped bench press
 500 kg equipped squat
 1000+ lb equipped squat
 1100+ lb equipped squat
 900+ lb equipped bench press
 1000+ lb equipped bench press
 2800+ lb equipped total

Football
Blaine played collegiate football at the Colorado School of Mines from 2006 to 2011 as a nose guard and short yardage fullback. He was multiple time All-RMAC, NFF All-Colorado, and Don Hansen All-Region.  Subsequent to his senior year he broke the NFL record for bench press reps with 52 at his Pro Day. Blaine also turned in a 33" vertical jump and 10' broad jump for an NFL Pro Day record Kirwan Explosive Index of 95. Blaine was not signed by any NFL team.

Other athletic achievements
Blaine competed in four sports in high school earning Conference MVP awards in both football and wrestling; team MVP awards in football, wrestling, and lacrosse; and setting school records in football, wrestling, lacrosse, and track/field.

Personal life
Blaine graduated from Conifer High School in 2006 and Colorado School of Mines in 2010.  He lives in Gillette, Wyoming and is a petroleum engineer.

In addition to his competitive powerlifting career, Blaine also is a published author in the powerlifting field and provides coaching to other powerlifters at his website www.blainesumner.com.

Personal competition records
Equipped
Squat - 
Bench press (Single Lift) - 1,003 pounds (455 kg)
Bench press - 939 pounds (426.0 kg)
Deadlift - 816 pounds (370 kg)
Total - 2,857 pounds (1,296.0 kg)
Raw (Classic)
Squat - 
Bench press - 
Deadlift - 
Total - 2,210 pounds (1,002.5 kg)

Record lifts in competition
Total -  -  USAPL Teen American Record +125 kg - 6/3/2007
Squat -  - USAPL Raw Open American Record +125 kg - 3/20/2010
Squat -  - USAPL Raw Junior American Record +125 kg - 3/20/2010
Deadlift -  - USAPL Raw Junior American Record +125 kg - 3/20/2010
Total -  - USAPL Raw Junior American Record +125 kg - 3/20/2010
Squat -  - USAPL Junior American Record +125 kg - 6/20/2010
Squat-  - USAPL Raw Open American Record +125 kg - 7/18/2010
Squat-  - USAPL Raw Junior American Record +125 kg - 7/18/2010
Deadlift -  - USAPL Raw Junior American Record +125 kg - 7/18/2010
Total -  - USAPL Raw Junior American Record +125 kg - 7/18/2010
Squat-  - USAPL Raw Open American Record +125 kg - 8/21/2011
Squat-  - IPF Open World Record +120 kg - 3/3/2012
Squat-  - IPF Raw Open World Record +120 kg - 4/1/2012
Squat-  - IPF Raw Open World Record +120 kg - 4/1/2012
Squat-  - IPF Raw Open World Record +120 kg - 4/1/2012
Squat-  - USAPL Raw Open American Record +125 kg - 4/1/2012
Total-  - IPF Raw Open World Record +120 kg - 4/1/2012
Total-  - IPF Raw Open World Record +120 kg - 4/1/2012
Squat-  - USAPL Open American Record +125 kg - 6/24/2012
Total-  - IPF Raw Open World Record +120 kg - 2/28/2014
Squat-  - USAPL Open American Record +120 kg - 3/1/2014
Bench Press-  - USAPL Open American Record +120 kg - 3/1/2014
Squat-  - USAPL Open American Record +120 kg - 5/17/2015
Squat-  - USAPL Open American Record +120 kg - 5/17/2015
Bench Press-  - USAPL Open American Record +120 kg - 5/17/2015
Bench Press-  - USAPL Open American Record +120 kg - 5/17/2015
Total-  - USAPL Open American Record +120 kg - 5/17/2015
Total-  - USAPL Open American Record +120 kg - 5/17/2015
Total-  - USAPL Raw Open American Record +120 kg - 9/12/2015
Total-  - IPF Raw Open World Record +120 kg - 9/12/2015
Squat-  - USAPL Open American Record +120 kg - 3/5/2016
Bench Press- 885 pounds (401.5 kg) - USAPL Open American  Record +120 kg - 3/5/2016
Bench Press (Single Lift)- 885 pounds (401.5 kg) - USAPL Open American Record +120 kg - 3/5/2016
Total- 2,715 pounds (1231.5 kg) - USAPL Open American Record +120 kg - 3/5/2016
Total- 2,803 pounds (1271.5 kg) - USAPL Open American Record +120 kg - 3/5/2016
Squat-  - IPF Open World Record +120 kg - 3/5/2016
Bench Press-  - IPF Open World Record +120 kg - 3/5/2016
Bench Press- 885 pounds (401.5 kg) - IPF Open World Record +120 kg - 3/5/2016
Bench Press (Single Lift)- 885 pounds (401.5 kg) - IPF Open World Record +120 kg - 3/5/2016
Total- 2,715 pounds (1231.5 kg) - IPF Open World Record +120 kg - 3/5/2016
Total- 2,803 pounds (1271.5 kg) - IPF Open World Record +120 kg - 3/5/2016
Squat-  - USAPL Open American Record +120 kg - 3/4/2017
Bench Press- 904 pounds (410 kg) - USAPL Open American  Record +120 kg - 3/4/2017
Bench Press (Single Lift)- 904 pounds (410 kg) - USAPL Open American Record +120 kg - 3/4/2017
Total- 2,805 pounds (1272.5 kg) - USAPL Open American Record +120 kg - 3/4/2017
Squat-  - IPF Open World Record +120 kg - 3/4/2017
Bench Press-  - IPF Open World Record +120 kg - 3/4/2017
Bench Press (Single Lift)- 904 pounds (410 kg) - IPF Open World Record +120 kg - 3/4/2017
Total- 2,805 pounds (1272.5 kg) - IPF Open World Record +120 kg - 3/4/2017
Bench Press- 915 pounds (415 kg) - USAPL Open American  Record +120 kg - 11/10/2018
Bench Press (Single Lift)- 915 pounds (415 kg) - USAPL Open American Record +120 kg - 11/10/2018
Bench Press-  - IPF Open World Record +120 kg - 11/10/2018
Bench Press (Single Lift)- 915 pounds (415 kg) - IPF Open World Record +120 kg - 11/10/2018
Bench Press (Single Lift)- 937 pounds (425 kg) - USAPL Open American Record +120 kg - 3/2/2019
Bench Press (Single Lift)- 1003 pounds (455 kg) - USAPL Open American Record +120 kg - 3/2/2019
Bench Press- 937 pounds (425 kg) - USAPL Open American Record +120 kg - 3/2/2019
Bench Press- 937 pounds (425 kg) - USAPL Open American Record +120 kg - 5/12/19
Bench Press (Single Lift)- 938 pounds (425.5 kg) - IPF Open World Record +120 kg - 11/23/19
Bench Press- 938 pounds (425.5 kg) - IPF Open World Record +120 kg - 11/23/19
Total- 2,812 pounds (1275.5 kg) - IPF Open World Record +120 kg - 11/23/19
Squat- 1,135 pounds (515.0 kg) - USAPL Open American Record +120 kg - 3/7/2020
Total- 2,813 pounds (1276.0 kg) - USAPL Open American Record +120 kg - 3/7/20
Total- 2,857 pounds (1296.0 kg) - USAPL Open American Record +120 kg - 3/7/20
Squat- 1,135 pounds (515.0 kg) - IPF Open World Record +120 kg - 3/7/2020
Bench Press (Single Lift)- 939 pounds (426.0 kg) - IPF Open World Record +120 kg - 3/7/20
Bench Press- 939 pounds (426.0 kg) - IPF Open World Record +120 kg - 3/7/20
Total- 2,813 pounds (1276.0 kg) - IPF Open World Record +120 kg - 3/7/20
Total- 2,857 pounds (1296.0 kg) - IPF Open World Record +120 kg - 3/7/20

References

External links
Jtstrong.com
Forum.reactivetrainingsystems.com
Jtsstrength.com
Criticalbench.com
Ironauthority.com
Youtube.com

1987 births
Living people
American strength athletes
American powerlifters
People from Conifer, Colorado
Competitors at the 2017 World Games